Ehrenfried Rudolph (born 14 August 1935) is a retired German cyclist who was active between 1957 and 1973. He won three medals at the UCI Motor-paced World Championships in 1966, 1968 and 1970, including a gold medal in 1970. 

As a road cyclist he competed in 69 six-day races, with the best result of fourth place.

After retiring from cycling he became a pacer in motor-paced racing.

References

1935 births
Sportspeople from Krefeld
Living people
German male cyclists
Cyclists from North Rhine-Westphalia
UCI Track Cycling World Champions (men)
German track cyclists